The Gottleuba (Rybný potok in the Czech Republic) is a small river in the Czech Republic and in Saxony, Germany. It is a left tributary of the Elbe.

The Gottleuba's source is in the eastern part of the Ore Mountains, north of Ústí nad Labem. After a few km it crosses the Czech-German border, and flows the rest of its  in Saxony. It passes the Gottleuba Dam and the town Bad Gottleuba-Berggießhübel, and flows into the Elbe in Pirna. In July 1927, there was a flash flood in the river due to heavy rain.

See also
List of rivers of Saxony
List of rivers of the Czech Republic

References

Rivers of Saxony
Rivers of the Ústí nad Labem Region
Rivers of Germany
International rivers of Europe